Fiorenzo Di Giovanni (born 11 March 1967) is a French rower. He competed in the men's quadruple sculls event at the 1992 Summer Olympics.

References

1967 births
Living people
French male rowers
Olympic rowers of France
Rowers at the 1992 Summer Olympics
Sportspeople from Neuilly-sur-Seine